The Iowa State Cyclones college football team competes as part of the National Collegiate Athletic Association (NCAA) Division I Football Bowl Subdivision (FBS), and represents the Iowa State University in the Big 12 Conference (Big 12). ISU has had 130 players drafted into the National Football League (NFL) since the first draft held in 1936, through the 2021 NFL Draft. ISU has only seen one player taken in the first round, George Amundson with the 14th overall pick in the 1973 NFL Draft by the Houston Oilers. Troy Davis was drafted in the third round of the 1997 NFL draft by the New Orleans Saints; he has since been inducted into the College Football Hall of Fame. Kelechi Osemele was drafted in the second round of the 2012 NFL draft by the Baltimore Ravens; he went on to win Super Bowl XLVII with the Ravens as their starting right tackle. Six former Cyclones who were drafted have been selected to a Pro Bowl or AFL All-Star Game.

Through the annual NFL Draft, each NFL franchise gets the chance to add new players to their teams. The current draft rules were established in 2009. The team with the worst record the previous year gets to pick first, then the next-worst team picks second, and so on. Teams that were not in the playoffs receive their draft order by their regular-season record. If 2 or more non-playoff teams have the same record, the tie breaker used is their strength of schedule. Playoff teams receive their draft order after all the non-playoff teams, based on their round of elimination (wild card, division, conference, and Super Bowl).

In 1944, the All-America Football Conference was established and it began play in 1946 in direct competition with the NFL. From 1946 to 1949, the two leagues fiercely competed for the top college football prospects with each league holding their own drafts, before the AAFC finally merged with the NFL at the end of the 1949 season.

Like the AAFC earlier, the American Football League (AFL) operated in direct competition with the NFL and held a separate draft. This led to a massive bidding war over top prospects between the two leagues. As part of the merger agreement on June 8, 1966, the two leagues would hold a multiple round "Common Draft". Once the AFL officially merged with the NFL in 1970, the "Common Draft" simply became the NFL Draft.



Key

Selections

Notable undrafted players
Note: No drafts held before 1920

See also

 List of Iowa State University people
Iowa State Cyclones football
History of Iowa State Cyclones football
List of Iowa State Cyclones football All-Americans
Iowa State Cyclones football statistical leaders

Notes

References

Iowa State

Iowa State Cyclones NFL Draft